Immigration Policy 2.0 is a European Union project that aims to facilitate the participation and involve immigrant citizens in immigration policies framed in Competitiveness and Innovation Framework Program(CIP)

The EU government organizations are developing new ways to be more effective in the control of 27 member countries' migration flows. For this purpose, the objective of the project, which began in September 2010 and completed in August 2013, is to centralize the concerns and demands of citizens through a digital platform to connect with the community through policies based on development collaborative processes.

Web 2.0, supported by modeling policies, manages to centralize services and process various demands through harmonized actions (user friendly). While these services are designed to ensure that citizens make responsible decisions based on the information provided.

Strands of action 
Strengthen government, politicians and decision making in order to work and collaborate based on immigration policies of the EU.
To facilitate the creation of social groups of legal immigrants in order to be informed and in turn evaluate such policies based on the audit of public opinion.

Manufacturers and Support Consortium 
Immigration Policy 2.0, Take advantage of the benefits offered by technologies such as BPM (Business Process Modelling) or ICT (Information and Communications Technology) with partners like BOC Group (BPM), ATOS (social media technology) or Singular Logic (Middleware, Open Survey System and Databases).

Objectives 
This European platform provides a common meeting point with services integrated by modulated processes. The information collected is stored in the cloud (host information) in order to be used for immigration law matters. Among its features are:

Decision making for the EU directives and municipal offices
Support Tools for immigration policies in the EU
Creating processes and procedures suitable for migration between countries
Creating and collecting civil documents
Achieving new legislative policies

There is now a great difficulty to quantify the fight against tax fraud and exploitation of illegal immigrants, in a situation in which European countries are in the process of adjustments due to the financial crisis that began in 2008.

One of the keys to combating the exploitation of immigration is to find new ways of monitoring for the analysis of these illegal moves through the so-called Semantic Web. A barrier in the EU is the difference between legal policies adopted by each one of the countries on its borders.

The new era Web 2.0 based on collaboration and content of the citizens themselves, or the phenomenon of the decade, the explosion of social networks are analyzed by the EU in order to eradicate the gray economy, which experts currently estimate between 10% and 20% of gross domestic product (GDP) of the European Union.

FP7 
The Seventh Framework Program (FP7 - Framework Program 7) is a series of multi-annual Framework Programs which have been the main instrument of the European Union for funding research and development since 1984, according to the preset Treaty by the European Community.

It is considered the main EU instrument for funding scientific research and technological development for the period 2007–2013, is one of the most important elements in realizing the Lisbon agenda for growth and competitiveness.

Technological Services Offered 
Research and Search Services
Knowledge Extraction Services
Management and Modeling Services (GMMS, Governmental Management and

Modelling Service)
Synchronization and standardization of immigration policies services
Database Services (ODSS, Open Debate Support Services)

Publications and External Links 
The technology platform of the Immigration Policy 2.0 in Spain was released in Evia
Immigration Policy 2.0 Workshop can be found at ePractice Portal
Immigration Policy 2.0 on Community Funding Guide

References 
Immigration Policy 2.0
Séptimo Programa Marco - FP7 - Información

See also 
Semantic Web
Web 2.0
Immigration policy
Business Process Management

Immigration to Europe